A plage is a clear, unornamented area on the basal area of an otherwise ornamented spore.  It is characteristic of spores from the euagaric genus Galerina.

External links

Images
 - line drawing
 - photo

Fungal morphology and anatomy